Mallakottai is the name of a panchayat village in the Indian state of Tamil Nadu. It was one of the villages of the ancient "Mallakottai Nadu" once, which was a part of 'Sivagangai Seemai'..

Geography 
Mallakottai is situated in the northern part of the Sivaganga district.

The village is a commercial center for nearby villages.

Some of the villages which surround Mallakottai are Jeyankondanilai (Sendalai), Vadavanpatti, Mampatti, Erumaipatti, Eriyur and Kattanipatti.

Economy 
The principal occupation of villagers is farming.

Culture 
Two historical temples are found in the village - the "Sri Santhiveeran Temple" and the "Periyakottai Muthayyanar Temple". The presiding deity of this temple is Santhiveeran.

Eruthugattu is an important festival of the Mallakottai village. Many legends are associated with it. The festival predates written history. Eruthugattu is enthusiastically celebrated for thirty days, each with myths, legends and beliefs.

Transport 
Mallakottai is approximately 50 minutes from the city of Madurai, traveling through Melur, Keelavalavu and Jayankondanilai from the west. Government bus lines reach the village. Kannappa and KVR private companies also operate bus transport. The village is one hour from Karaikudi traveling through Thiruppathur, Aralikottai and Eriyur. The village is one hour from the historical city of Maruthu Pandiyar Sivagangai traveling through Madagupatti, Alavakottai, and Kattanipatti and one hour from the "green" town of Singampunari traveling through S.S.Kottai, Nainapatti.

Infrastructure 

 Government Hospital with Emergency service
 Water supply Board Controlled by Village Administration
 Government Agricultural Support Office
 Government Head Post Office
 Village Administration Office
 Government Grocery Shop
 BSNL Telecom's Customer Support Office
 Bus Terminals
 Dhiya minimart
 Mega bulemetals
 Raji minerals
 N N L infra

Education 

Government Higher Secondary School
 Government Library Facilities

Villages 
 

Sethamallipatti
Otapatti
Kovilpatti
Mottamallipatti
Vadaikavalavu

References

External links

 Information about Sivaganga district

Cities and towns in Sivaganga district